The 1994 Army Cadets football team was an American football team that represented the United States Military Academy in the 1994 NCAA Division I-A football season. In their fourth season under head coach Bob Sutton, the Cadets compiled a 4–7 record and were outscored by their opponents by a combined total of 252 to 215.  In the annual Army–Navy Game, the Cadets defeated Navy, 22–20.

Schedule

Roster

Season summary

Louisville

vs Navy

Kurt Heiss, who suffered from a congenital eye condition and had trouble seeing the goal posts, made the game-winning kick for Army.

References

Army
Army Black Knights football seasons
Army Cadets football